Robert S. Kerr Airport  is a city-owned, public-use airport located two nautical miles (4 km) south of the central business district of Poteau, a city in Le Flore County, Oklahoma, United States. It is included in the National Plan of Integrated Airport Systems for 2011–2015, which categorized it as a general aviation facility.

Facilities and aircraft 
Robert S. Kerr Airport covers an area of 175 acres (71 ha) at an elevation of 450 feet (137 m) above mean sea level. It has one runway designated 18/36 with an asphalt surface measuring 4,007 by 75 feet (1,221 x 23 m).

For the 12-month period ending September 21, 2011, the airport had 6,000 general aviation aircraft operations, an average of 16 per day. At that time there were 27 aircraft based at this airport: 89% single-engine and 11% ultralight.

References

External links 
 Robert S. Kerr Airport (RKR) at Oklahoma Aeronautics Commission
 Aerial image as of February 1995 from USGS The National Map
 

Airports in Oklahoma
Buildings and structures in Le Flore County, Oklahoma